James Earl Major (January 5, 1887 – January 4, 1972) was an American lawyer, jurist, and politician. He served as a United States representative from Illinois, a United States circuit judge of the United States Court of Appeals for the Seventh Circuit and a United States district judge of the United States District Court for the Southern District of Illinois.

Education and career

Born in Donnellson, Illinois, Major attended the common and high schools of his native city. He graduated from Brown's Business College in 1907 and from the Illinois College of Law (now DePaul University College of Law) at Chicago in 1909. He was admitted to the bar in 1910 and commenced the practice of law in Hillsboro, Illinois in 1912. He served as prosecuting attorney of Montgomery County, Illinois from 1912 to 1920.

Congressional service

Major was elected as a Democrat to the 68th United States Congress, serving from March 4, 1923, to March 3, 1925. He was an unsuccessful candidate for reelection in 1924 to the 69th Congress. He resumed the practice law in Hillsboro until he was elected to the 70th Congress, serving from March 4, 1927, to March 3, 1929. He was an unsuccessful candidate for reelection in 1928 to the 71st Congress, but was elected to the 72nd and 73rd Congresses and served from March 4, 1931, until his resignation on October 6, 1933, having been appointed to the bench. During his final term, he was one of the managers appointed by the United States House of Representatives in 1933 to conduct the impeachment proceedings against Harold Louderback, Judge of the United States District Court for the Northern District of California.

Federal judicial service

Major received a recess appointment from President Franklin D. Roosevelt on June 12, 1933, to a seat on the United States District Court for the Southern District of Illinois vacated by Judge Louis FitzHenry. He was nominated to the same position by President Roosevelt on January 8, 1934. He was confirmed by the United States Senate on January 23, 1934, and received his commission on January 26, 1934. His service terminated on April 5, 1937, due to his elevation to the Seventh Circuit.

Major was nominated by President Roosevelt on March 9, 1937, to a seat on the United States Court of Appeals for the Seventh Circuit vacated by Judge Louis FitzHenry. He was confirmed by the Senate on March 17, 1937, and received his commission on March 23, 1937. He served as Chief Judge from 1948 to 1954 and served as a member of the Judicial Conference of the United States from 1949 to 1954. He assumed senior status on March 23, 1956.

Death
Major died on January 4, 1972, in Hillsboro, where he had resided. He was interred in Oak Grove Cemetery.

References

Sources

External links
 James Earl Major Historical Society of Montgomery County Illinois

1887 births
1972 deaths
Judges of the United States District Court for the Southern District of Illinois
United States district court judges appointed by Franklin D. Roosevelt
Judges of the United States Court of Appeals for the Seventh Circuit
United States court of appeals judges appointed by Franklin D. Roosevelt
20th-century American judges
Democratic Party members of the United States House of Representatives from Illinois
People from Hillsboro, Illinois